Sultana Ahmed is a Bangladesh Nationalist Party politician and the former Member of  the Bangladesh Parliament from a reserved seat.

Career
Ahmed was elected to parliament from reserved seat as a Bangladesh Nationalist Party candidate in 2005. She is the General Secretary of Jatiyatabadi Mohila Dal.

References

Bangladesh Nationalist Party politicians
Living people
Women members of the Jatiya Sangsad
8th Jatiya Sangsad members
Year of birth missing (living people)
21st-century Bangladeshi women politicians